Medical paternalism is a set of attitudes and practices in medicine in which a physician determines that a patient's wishes or choices should not be honored. These practices were current through the early to mid 20th century, and were characterised by a paternalistic attitude, surrogate decision-making and a lack of respect for patient autonomy. It is almost exclusively undertaken with the intention of benefiting the patient, although this is not always the case.  In the past, paternalism was considered an absolute medical necessity, as there was little to no public understanding of medical procedures and practices.  However, in recent years, paternalism has become limited and blind faith in doctors' decisions has come to be frowned upon.

By the end of the 20th century and into the 21st, paternalistic medicine was increasingly seen as inappropriate in the West with guidance from professional bodies such as the General Medical Council indicating that it is ethically unsupportable.

History 
In the 18th century, medical paternalism was considered necessary.  It was believed that only a doctor could properly understand symptoms and draw useful conclusions.  During this period, the prevailing consensus was that disease was nothing more than symptoms.  This meant that the individual history of the patient didn't matter in providing care, so the patient him or herself was irrelevant in the medical encounter.  Thus it was deemed necessary that physicians make decisions for patients. This view of paternalism was only encouraged by the rise of hospitals in the later 18th century.  Because patients in hospitals were often sick and disabled, the view of them as passive recipients of medical care only became more prevalent.

The movement away from paternalism can be traced back to the relationship between early psychologists and their patients. In particular, Josef Breuer and Sigmund Freud urged that importance be placed on communication with and understanding of the patient.  This sharply contrasted the view of patients as passive, and placed them at the center of the medical encounter.  These practices also treated patients as unique, instead of simply being a collection of symptoms to be fixed by a paternalistic doctor.

In 1956, Szasz and Hollender introduced three models of paternalism to the medical community, thereby legitimizing the view that doctors did not necessarily have to dominate patients.  The models are as follows:
 Activity—passivity refers to the traditional version of paternalism, in which the doctor treats the patient as one who cannot or should not make decisions.  This relationship is similar to that of a parent and child.  Treatment is performed "irrespective of the patient's contribution and regardless of outcome."  This model is considered justified in emergency situations in which there is no time to consider the patient's preferences or contributions.
 Guidance—co-operation is a relationship used in more long-term situations.  The doctor provides instructions to the patient, to which the patient is expected to comply.  The name comes from the expectation that the physician will guide the patient, who will co-operate, but who retains their individuality.  
 Mutual participation involves the physician making it clear that he or she is not infallible and does not always know what is best.  This model is more of a partnership, in which the doctor helps the patient to help him or herself.  This model is often employed in cases of chronic disease or pain, in which the patient can have a higher degree of freedom and be more independent of the doctor.

Strong vs. weak paternalism 
Strong and weak paternalism (sometimes referred to as limited and extended paternalism) are two philosophies regarding when it is appropriate for a doctor to ignore a patient's wishes. The fundamental difference lies in the patient's capacity to make well-informed decisions for themselves. Weak (or limited) paternalism refers to a situation in which the physician will only disobey the patient's requests if the patient cannot demonstrate that their choices are voluntary and well-informed. As such, even if the doctor disagrees with the patient's desire, he or she will not intervene as long as the patient is of sound mind. Strong (or extended) paternalism involves a doctor superseding a patient's requests in cases where the doctor has determined a better course of action, even when the patient's requests are made voluntarily. These cases typically arise when the physician has determined that a patient's decision is unreasonable because of the risks involved, or potential costs to the patient's well-being.

Legality 
Due to the subjective nature of when and to what extent paternalism is necessary, physicians who engage in paternalism may find themselves in a complicated legal situation.  Throughout history there have been many cases in which a patient is reported to have made a well-informed choice (while of sound mind) to opt for a medically improper treatment, or one that is very costly to their well-being.  If the doctor does not take a paternalistic stance, and instead goes through with the patient's wishes, the question arises as to whether malpractice occurred.  There exists an expectation of doctors to provide as much information as is appropriate to their patients, as well as an expectation that they do not keep anything relevant secret.  This creates a difficult legal situation in which a decision has to be made about what the correct amount of information is, and how best to present it.  For example, a patient may read everything available to them and ultimately decide on undergoing a procedure with a 95% survival rate.  However, that same patient may not choose the same procedure if it is presented as carrying a 5% risk of dying.  As such, in cases in which things go awry it is the courts' responsibility to determine whether the physician is at fault, and whether he or she should have ignored the patient's requests.

Relationship with euthanasia 
In many cases, particularly countries in which voluntary euthanasia is illegal, physicians must exercise medical paternalism by not respecting patients' wishes to die.  There are contrasting views on whether this constitutes weak or strong paternalism.  One argument is that weak paternalism allows the physician to stay completely hands-off.  If the patient is in a sound state of mind and the doctor can reasonably guess what they desire, so there is no need for further action.  They do not need to keep the patient alive, nor do they need to allow the patient to die.  In this sense, one could argue that weak medical paternalism has no contradictions with allowing a patient to undergo voluntary euthanasia.

The relationship between strong medical paternalism and euthanasia is slightly more complicated.  There are questions of a philosophical nature that must be addressed.  For example, a strong paternalist would have to determine whether it is always objectively bad for a human to die, even if that human could prove that it was their desire to do so.  In these cases, a physician may defer to morality or religion in order to make a decision.  They would perhaps present the argument that even if a person wished to die, it would be an irrational desire and they should not indulge it.  However, in the absence of these factors, it is possible for strong paternalism to be compatible with voluntary euthanasia.  This would require the patient to make it clear that he or she would not be losing anything of value to them by dying, i.e. fundamentally disconnecting life from goodness.  For example, if a patient learns that he or she would be in constant pain for the rest of his or her life, it is not irrational to honor their wishes to die.  In these cases, some argue, even a strong paternalism does not justify prolonging the patient's life, because the physicians actions would not truly be for the patient's own good.

See also
 Patient participation
 Shared decision-making

References

External links
 

Medicine in society